"This Is How We Party" is the debut single of Danish pop duo S.O.A.P., written by Remee and Holger Lagerfeldt. It was their biggest hit, making it into the top 10 in many countries, including Sweden, where it reached  1. The single is certified platinum in Australia and gold in Belgium, France, New Zealand, and Sweden. In 2017, BuzzFeed listed the song at No. 100 on their list of "The 101 Greatest Dance Songs of the '90s". In 2019, it was sampled in the song of the same name by R3hab and Icona Pop.

Release and reception
The song was made available for purchase in the US on 31 March 1998 and was scheduled to debut on radio on 16 March, though it ended up being played before that date. It received significant radio coverage in the US.

Larry Flick from Billboard gave a favourable review of the song, calling it a "synth-happy pop shuffler" with "harmonized vocals" that "suits the song's 'let's have fun' tone just fine". In May 1998, another editor Michael Paoletta stated that S.O.A.P. had made an "impressive splash" in the US with the debut single. Matt Stopera and Brian Galindo from BuzzFeed said "it's basically 1998 in the form of a song." Chad Watson from The Newcastle Herald stated the song had "enough sugar to lure children and enough spice to tempt night-clubbers." Kris Teo from the Sunday Mail  also gave a favourable review, calling the track "pure bubblegum" that "should have preteens singing along with thoughtless cheer."

Music video
Heidi and Saseline (credited as 'Line' in the video) are seen preparing their outfits and makeup at night in their home while singing the lyrics to the song. A photograph of a young man in a black vest is seen on Heidi's mirror, and Line clutches a photo frame containing an image of the same man. Wearing bathrobes, they make phone calls before escorting their parents to the front door. Once their parents leave, they remove their robes, revealing their party attire. A crowd of people immediately comes to the house, and a party begins inside. A young man dressed in a green suit, bow tie and glasses enters the party, as does the man in Heidi and Line's photo's (portrayed by the same actor). Heidi and Line dance on stage with the man in the vest, before rejecting him for the man in the green suit. When the girl's parents return home and see the party their mother faints, though their father appears amused. The participants of the party flee the house, and Heidi and Line are seen leaving in the arms of the man in the green suit.

Track listings
The S.O.A.P. samples released on the US formats consist of "Ladidi Ladida", "Wishing", "Stand by You", "Who Can I Talk To", and "Not Like Other Girls".

Danish CD single
 "This Is How We Party" (album version) – 3:17
 "This Is How We Party" (rap version featuring Remee) – 3:34
 "This Is How We Party" (karaoke version) – 3:34

European CD single
 "This Is How We Party" (album version) – 3:17
 "This Is How We Party" (rap version featuring Remee) – 3:34

European 12-inch single
A1. "This Is How We Party" (the Almighty Mighty mix—edit) – 3:57
A2. "This Is How We Party" (the Almighty Mighty mix) – 7:34
B1. "This Is How We Party" (album version) – 3:20
B2. "This Is How We Party" (the Almighty dub) – 6:19

UK CD1
 "This Is How We Party" (album version) – 3:19
 "This Is How We Party" (Almighty club mix) – 7:37
 "This Is How We Party" (Almighty dub mix) – 6:20

UK CD2
 "This Is How We Party" (Almighty radio version) – 3:19
 "This Is How We Party" (Gotta Party mix) – 3:49
 "This Is How We Party" (Gotta Party extended mix) – 6:37
 "This Is How We Party" (rap version featuring Remee) – 3:34

UK cassette single
 "This Is How We Party" (album version) – 3:19
 "This Is How We Party" (Almighty radio version) – 3:19

US CD single
 "This Is How We Party" – 3:19
 S.O.A.P. samples – 4:58

Australian CD single
 "This Is How We Party" (album version)
 "This Is How We Party" (Almighty Mighty mix)
 "This Is How We Party" (rap version featuring Remee)
 "This Is How We Party" (karaoke version)

Charts

Weekly charts

Year-end charts

Certifications

Release history

References

1998 songs
1998 debut singles
Crave Records singles
Columbia Records singles
Number-one singles in Sweden
Portrait Records singles
Songs written by Remee